The Soda Lakes are two lakes located northwest of Fallon, Nevada. They occupy two basaltic maar volcano craters which may have erupted in the last 1500 years. The larger lake, called Soda Lake or Big Soda Lake, is somewhat elongated, stretching  in length. Considered to be a single volcano, the combined craters are young enough that future activity can't be ruled out. A geothermal power plant is located on the northeast flank of the volcano.

A significant increase in level of Big Soda Lake occurred in the early 20th century due to increased groundwater table. It became a meromictic lake where the deeper water no longer mixes with surface waters. New tufa formations have served as a rare research example of tufa's rate of growth within a century.

Geology

Maar volcanoes such as at Soda Lakes are formed by explosive eruptions when magma comes into contact with groundwater.

The Lahontan Valley floor around Soda Lakes consists of ancient Lake Lahontan sediments. The Soda Lakes volcano's age is inferred as less than 6000 years because it is younger than the lake sediments. Fault lines in the Carson Valley trend to the northeast. Other older volcanoes nearby include the Upsal Hogback basalt cone 7 miles northeast and Rattlesnake Hill in Fallon.

Volcano monitoring
Soda Lakes is the only volcano in Nevada currently listed on the USGS Volcano Hazards Program. It was added in 2018 with an initial assessment as a moderate threat potential. Since the volcano's age was inferred to be younger than local Lake Lahontan sediments, that qualified as eruptive activity within the Holocene for inclusion on the list. It is monitored by the USGS California Volcano Observatory, which includes Nevada in its region.

Geothermal plant

Exploration of the geothermal field in the Carson Desert near Soda Lakes began in the 1970s. The Soda Lake I & II geothermal energy plants came online in 1987 and 1991 respectively, with continuing development by multiple owners.

19th-century exploration

A spring at Big Soda Lake provided the first drinkable water for 1800s wagon travelers on the Carson Trail at the end of the Forty Mile Desert, 2 miles before reaching the Carson River.

The lakes are classified as soda lakes, hence the name. In 1875, two commercial facilities were built for extraction of soda from the lake, for use by the Nevada mining industry.

According to an early study of Soda Lakes, Russell (1885) describes the Soda Lake basin at the time as follows:

The rim of the larger lake in its highest part rises 80 feet above the surrounding desert, and is 165 feet higher than the surface of the lake which it incloses. The outer slope of the cone is gentle and merges almost imperceptibly with the desert surface; but the inner slope is abrupt and at times approaches the perpendicular. A series of careful soundings gives 147 feet as the greatest depth of the lake. The total depth of the depression is therefore 312 feet, and its bottom is 232 feet lower than the general surface of the desert near at hand.

Early 20th-century lake level increase
Following the construction of Lahontan Dam on the Carson River in 1911–1916, the groundwater table rose in the Lahontan Valley downstream of the reservoir. Additional water for irrigation was brought to Lahontan Reservoir from the Truckee River via a canal from Derby Dam.

Meromictic lake
Due to the rise in water level, Big Soda Lake became a meromictic lake. The denser lower layer is colder and more saline, and no longer mixes with the surface layer at any time of year. It is anoxic, or completely depleted of oxygen, below the chemocline boundary.

The chemocline was listed as at  depth in 1983 and 2015 papers, showing it had not continued to fall but remained stable around the level measured in the 1970s.

Tufa formations
The lake level increase also started tufa formations to grow from interaction of incoming springs with lake minerals and bacteria. Due to fluctuations in the lake level, sometimes the tops of the tufa are out of the water. These tufa formations became subject of research interest because lake level increase constrains their age to a century, which is a geologically short period of time. Compared to other usually-slower geological processes, the rate of growth of the tufa surprised observers.

Roads
Nevada State Route 723 is a 2 mile long state highway on part of Soda Lake Road since 1978.

See also
 LORAN-C transmitter Fallon now closed, is located near Soda Lakes off State Route 723
 Ragtown is a historical emigrant trail stop and ghost town near Soda Lakes

References

External links

 "Sparkling or still? A tour of geology from Soda Lakes to Stillwater Marsh, Nevada", geology field trip guide from Nevada Bureau of Mines and Geology Science Week tour in Oct 2018
 "Biogeochemical investigation of Soda Lake", posterboard from 2010 presentation on Soda Lakes chemistry by University of Nevada, Las Vegas
 Carson Trail at Emigrant Trails West, mentions spring at Soda Lakes used by wagon trail after Forty Mile Desert
 Videos
 Big Soda Lake (day 1), YouTube video by arsenicbug with discussion of meromictic lakes and their bacteria, tufa formations
 Steam Tractor at Soda Lake, YouTube video by ucam1 (SCUBA diver view of submerged soda production facility)

Lakes of Churchill County, Nevada
Lakes of Nevada
Volcanic crater lakes
Volcanoes of Nevada
Maars of Nevada
Holocene volcanoes
Inactive volcanoes
Meromictic lakes